Leeka is a rural locality on Flinders Island in the local government area (LGA) of Flinders in the North-east LGA region of Tasmania. The 2016 census recorded a population of nil for the state suburb of Leeka.

History 
Leeka was gazetted as a locality in 1970.

Geography
The waters of Bass Strait form the southern boundary.

Road infrastructure 
Route B85 (Palana Road) runs along the eastern boundary. From there, West End Road provides access to the locality.

References

Towns in Tasmania
Flinders Island